Dušan Pašek (7 September 1960 – 15 March 1998) was a Czechoslovak and Slovak professional ice hockey forward who played 48 games in the National Hockey League with the Minnesota North Stars. The rest of his career, which lasted from 1977 to 1993, was mainly spent with Slovan Bratislava in the Czechoslovak Extraliga. He won a silver medal at the 1984 Winter Olympics and represented Czechoslovakia at three Canada Cups. He also won a gold medal at the 1985 World Ice Hockey Championships.

Pašek was president of the Slovak Ice Hockey Federation when he committed suicide by gunshot on 15 March 1998. Reasons for his death are unknown. His son, Dušan Pašek, also committed suicide (by hanging) in November 2021.

Career statistics

Regular season and playoffs

International

References

External links
 

1960 births
1998 deaths
1998 suicides
Czechoslovak ice hockey centres
Ice hockey people from Bratislava
Ice hockey players at the 1984 Winter Olympics
Ice hockey players at the 1988 Winter Olympics
Medalists at the 1984 Winter Olympics
HC Slovan Bratislava players
HC Dukla Jihlava players
Minnesota North Stars draft picks
Minnesota North Stars players
Olympic ice hockey players of Czechoslovakia
Olympic medalists in ice hockey
Olympic silver medalists for Czechoslovakia
Slovak ice hockey centres
Suicides by firearm in Slovakia
Czechoslovak expatriate sportspeople in the United States
Czechoslovak expatriate sportspeople in Italy
Czechoslovak expatriate sportspeople in Switzerland
Slovak expatriate sportspeople in Austria
Czechoslovak expatriate ice hockey people
Slovak expatriate ice hockey people
Expatriate ice hockey players in the United States
Expatriate ice hockey players in Italy
Expatriate ice hockey players in Switzerland
Expatriate ice hockey players in Austria